The 2003 Nigerian Senate election in Bayelsa State was held on April 12, 2003, to elect members of the Nigerian Senate to represent Bayelsa State. John Kojo Brambaifa representing Bayelsa West, David Brigidi representing Bayelsa Central and Inatimi Rufus-Spiff representing Bayelsa East all won on the platform of the Peoples Democratic Party.

Overview

Summary

Results

Bayelsa West 
The election was won by John Kojo Brambaifa of the Peoples Democratic Party.

Bayelsa Central 
The election was won by David Brigidi of the Peoples Democratic Party.

Bayelsa East 
The election was won by Inatimi Rufus-Spiff of the Peoples Democratic Party.

References 

Senate
Bayelsa
Bayelsa State Senate elections